Bésame En La Boca may refer to:

 Bésame En La Boca (film), a 1995 Mexican film
 "Bésame En La Boca" (song), a 1995 song by Paulina Rubio